Thornbury railway station is located on the Mernda line in Victoria, Australia. It serves the northern Melbourne suburb of Thornbury, and it opened on 8 October 1889.

History

Opening on 8 October 1889, when the Inner Circle line was extended from North Fitzroy to Reservoir, Thornbury station, like the suburb itself, is named after the Thornbury Park Estate, named after a farm owned by settler Job Smith. Smith named the farm after his birthplace in England.

In 1973, both platforms were extended at the Down end of the station.

During October 1987, the double line block system between Thornbury and Northcote was abolished, and replaced with three-position signalling, with all two position signals between Thornbury and Merri also abolished. A number of signal posts were also abolished during this time.

Around 1987-1988, boom barriers replaced interlocked gates at the Hutton Street level crossing, located at the Up end of the station.

Announced as part of a $21.9 million package in the 2022/23 Victorian State Budget, Thornbury, alongside other stations, will receive accessibility upgrades, the installation of CCTV, and platform shelters. The development process will begin in late 2022 or early 2023, with a timeline for the upgrades to be released once construction has begun.

Platforms and services

Thornbury has two side platforms. It is serviced by Metro Trains' Mernda line services.

Platform 1:
  all stations and limited express services to Flinders Street

Platform 2:
  all stations services to Mernda

Transport links

Yarra Trams operates two routes via Thornbury station:
 : West Preston – Victoria Harbour (Docklands)
 : Bundoora RMIT – Waterfront City (Docklands)

Gallery

References

External links
 Melway map at street-directory.com.au

Railway stations in Melbourne
Railway stations in Australia opened in 1889
Railway stations in the City of Darebin